Shilimb is a village in India, situated in the Mawal taluka of Pune district in the state of Maharashtra.

Administration
The village is administrated by a sarpanch, an elected representative who leads a gram panchayat. At the time of the 2011 Census of India, the village was the headquarters for the eponymous gram panchayat, which also governed the villages of Kadav and Vagheshwar.

Demographics
At the 2011 census, the village comprised 199 households. The population of 1122 was split between 577 males and 545 females.

At that time, 632 of the people were literate, giving a literacy rate of 64.36 percent. The male literacy was 71.34 percent and that for females was 56.93 percent.

See also
List of villages in Mawal taluka

References

Villages in Mawal taluka
Gram Panchayats in Pune district